Bobrowniki  is a village in Będzin County, Silesian Voivodeship, in southern Poland. It is the seat of the gmina (administrative district) called Gmina Bobrowniki.

The village has a population of 2,926.

References

Bobrowniki
Kielce Voivodeship (1919–1939)